Charlotte Cooper defeated Louisa Martin 8–6, 5–7, 6–1 in the All Comers' Final, but the reigning champion Blanche Hillyard defeated Cooper 4–6, 6–4, 6–4 in the challenge round to win the ladies' singles tennis title at the 1900 Wimbledon Championships. Marion Jones (USA) was the first female competitor from overseas.

Draw

Challenge round

All Comers'

References

External links

Women's Singles
Wimbledon Championship by year – Women's singles
Wimbledon Championships - Singles
Wimbledon Championships - Singles